Abdul Monem Limited (AML) is one of the largest Bangladeshi industrial conglomerates. The industries under this conglomerate include beverages, sugar refinery, consumer products, real estate, construction materials etc.

AML was established by Abdul Monem, a pioneer Industrial leader in the private sector of Bangladesh. A veteran civil engineer, Abdul Monem founded the conglomerate in 1956. The group is currently made up of more than 20 different companies. It has also set up one of Bangladesh's first and largest private economic zones. The company is the official bottler of Coca-Cola in Bangladesh.

List of companies
Sugar Refinery

 Abdul Monem Sugar Refinery Ltd.

Beverages

 Bottler of Coca-Cola Company.

Food

 Igloo Dairy Ltd.

 Igloo Foods Ltd.

 Igloo Ice-Cream Unit.

 AM Bran Oil.

Real Estate

 AML Construction Ltd.
 Monem Business District

Financials 

 AM Securities & Financial Services Ltd.

Pharmaceuticals

 Novus Pharmaceuticals Ltd.

Private Economic Zone

 Abdul Monem Economic Zone (AMEZ) in Daudkandi, Munshiganj

Construction

 AML Asphalt and Ready Mix Concrete Ltd.
 Auto Bricks Ltd.
 Danish Bangla Emulsion Ltd.
 AM Dredging Ltd.

See also
 List of companies of Bangladesh

References

External links
 AML information

Conglomerate companies of Bangladesh
Companies based in Dhaka